Welfare department may refer to:

United States Department of Health, Education, and Welfare
Department of Social Welfare and Development
Health, Welfare and Food Bureau of Hong Kong
Pennsylvania Department of Public Welfare, former name of Pennsylvania Department of Human Services

See also
Welfare (financial aid)